Lycopene ε-cyclase (CrtL-e, LCYe) is an enzyme with systematic name carotenoid psi-end group lyase (decyclizing). This enzyme catalyses the following chemical reaction

carotenoid psi-end group  carotenoid epsilon-end group

The carotenoid lycopene has the psi-end group at both ends.

References

External links 
 

EC 5.5.1